Slangman's World is a live-action/animation children's program that introduces preschoolers ages 2–6 to the world of foreign languages and cultures in an environment of music, puppetry, animation, and magic. Slangman, the show's host, played by David Burke, a high-energy, unpredictable wizard and wordsmith, invites a studio audience of children into his enchanted multicultural world where his animated costars Wordy, Gizma, Blue Cat, Crash, and Cloudy help children broaden their language skills and their view of the world.

Slangman's World debuted its first season of programming for American Forces Network (AFN), one of the network's first original children's programs in its 66-year history. The show aired in 174 countries across AFN where it helped military families integrate into their foreign language environments. Its second season appeared on Georgia Public Broadcasting, the third-largest Public Broadcasting Service (PBS) affiliate in America.

Episodes

References 

2007 American television series debuts
2008 American television series endings
2000s American animated television series
2000s American children's television series
2000s preschool education television series
American children's animated fantasy television series
American children's animated musical television series
American preschool education television series
American television series with live action and animation
American television shows featuring puppetry
Animated preschool education television series
Early childhood education in the United States
English-language television shows
American Forces Network
Local children's television programming in the United States